Izzatnagar railway division at Izzatnagar railway station located in Bareilly is a railway division under North Eastern Railway zone of Indian Railways. This railway division was formed on 14 April 1952.

Varanasi railway division and Lucknow NER railway division are the other two railway divisions under NER Zone headquartered at Gorakhpur.

List of railway stations and towns 
The list includes the stations  under the Izzatnagar railway division and their station category.

Stations closed for Passengers -

References

 
Divisions of Indian Railways
1952 establishments in Uttar Pradesh